Colthrop Lock is a lock on the Kennet and Avon Canal, at Thatcham, Berkshire, England.

Colthrop Lock was built between 1718 and 1723 under the supervision of the engineer John Hore of Newbury. The canal is administered by the Canal & River Trust. The lock has a rise/fall of 7 ft 7 in (2.31 m).

References

External links
Heale's Lock to Newbury on www.tonycanalpics.co.uk

See also

Locks on the Kennet and Avon Canal

Locks on the Kennet and Avon Canal
Locks of Berkshire